DreamWeaver is the 32nd and final studio album by American keyboardist and record producer George Duke. It was released on July 16, 2013 through Big Piano Music and Heads Up International. Recording sessions for the album took place at Le Gonks West in Los Angeles, California. The album is dedicated to Corine Duke, who died in 2011.

Track listing

Personnel 
 George Duke – vocals (tracks: 3, 5, 7, 8, 12, 15), synthesizer (tracks: 1-10, 12-14), Rhodes electric piano (tracks: 2, 4, 7-9, 11, 12), piano (tracks: 2, 5, 7, 8, 12, 14), drum programming (tracks: 3, 7, 8, 13, 15), keyboards (track 5), minimoog (tracks: 11, 15), ARP Odyssey (track 11), clavinet (track 14), Wurlitzer electric piano (track 15), producer

 Lamont Van Hook – backing vocals (tracks: 3, 5, 8, 12)
 Shannon Pearson – backing vocals (track 3)
 Terry Dexter – backing vocals (tracks: 3, 8), vocals (track 7)
 Jim Gilstrap – backing vocals (tracks: 5, 12, 15), vocals (track 7)
 Rachelle Ferrell – vocals (track 5)
 Kennedy Fuselier – vocals (track 7)
 Bebe Winans – vocals (track 7)
 Dira Sugandi – vocals (track 7)
 Freddie Jackson – vocals (track 7)
 Howard Hewett – vocals (track 7)
 Jeffrey Osborne – vocals (track 7)
 Lalah Hathaway – vocals (track 7)
 Lori Perry – vocals (track 7), backing vocals (tracks: 12, 15)
 Josie James – backing vocals (track 8)
 Teena Marie – vocals (track 13)
 Chill – rap vocals (track 8)
 Paul Jackson Jr. – guitar (tracks: 4, 7, 11)
 Jef Lee Johnson – guitar (tracks: 5, 9, 12, 14, 15)
 Michael Landau – guitar (track 8)
 Stanley Clarke – electric upright bass (track 2)
 Larry Kimpel – bass (tracks: 5, 9, 12, 15)
 Michael Manson – bass (track 11)
 Christian McBride – bass (track 14)
 Gordon Campbell – drums (tracks: 2, 4, 5, 9, 11, 12, 15)
 John Roberts – drums (track 14)
 Lenny Castro – percussion (track 11)
 Everette Harp – alto saxophone (tracks: 2, 4, 8, 14)
 Kamasi Washington – tenor saxophone (tracks: 2, 3, 4, 8, 13, 14)
 Daniel Higgins – flute (track 2), tenor saxophone (track 4)
 Gary E. Grant – trumpet (tracks: 2, 4)
 Michael "Patches" Stewart – trumpet (tracks: 3, 8, 13, 14)
 Ramon Flores – trumpet (track 8)
 Alan Kaplan – trombone (tracks: 8, 14)
 Erik Zobler – mixing & mastering
 Lisa Chamblee Hampton – assistant engineering
 Randall Moses – art direction & design
 Toshihiro Sakurai – photography

Chart history

References

External links 

Dreamweaver on George Duke's website
DreamWeaver by George Duke on iTunes

2013 albums
George Duke albums
Heads Up International albums
Albums produced by George Duke